Polesine Zibello is a comune in the province of Parma, Emilia-Romagna, northern Italy. It was formed on 1 January 2016 after the merger of the comuni of Polesine Parmense and Zibello.

The municipality is located in the Bassa Parmense area, northwest of Parma, it borders on Busseto, the home town of Giuseppe Verdi, and is one of the few places where culatello salami is produced.

References